Argo was part of a project to make the Internet accessible to scholars in the Humanities at the University of Groningen. The Argo web browser was created in August 1994 by Bert Bos.

There currently is no publicly available compiled version, although the source code still exists.

History
The Argo browser was able to handle its own style sheet language called Stream-based Style Sheet Proposal (SSP) rendered mostly by Xlib/Xrm. SSP was general enough to be able to be applied to other markup languages in addition to HTML. In the development process of Cascading Style Sheets (CSS) Bos was one of the first people who decided to join Håkon Wium Lie. Although this early adoption SSP had other advanced features that could not be integrated in CSS1 and had to wait for CSS2. Arena and Argo were presented as a testbed at the World Wide Web Conference 3 on 10–14 April 1995 in Darmstadt

Functionality
Argo based on the W3A, an API for WWW browser applets. The browser featured plug-in modules, or "applets", which allowed for the addition of new functionality without recompilation. Examples of such functionality provided by the applets includes adding support for the following:

 Bookmarks/history
 Cache/proxy support
 Data formats (e.g. ASCII, GIF, HTML, JPEG, XBM, XPM)
 E-mail clients (e.g. Mutt, Pine)
 Protocols: FTP, gopher, HTTP, NNTP, WAIS, local files
 Graphical navigation

The browser's kernel depended on the modules to provide such functionality.

Technical
The browser was run on HP-UX and used dynamic loading to support its applets.

See also
Cascading Style Sheets

References

External links
The Argo source code

1994 software
Discontinued web browsers
Gopher clients
Usenet clients